Sushant Mishra (born 23 December 2000) is an Indian cricketer. He made his List A debut on 8 December 2021, for Jharkhand in the 2021–22 Vijay Hazare Trophy. Prior to his List A debut, he was named in India's squad for the 2020 Under-19 Cricket World Cup. He made his first-class debut on 17 February 2022, for Jharkhand in the 2021–22 Ranji Trophy.

References

External links
 

2000 births
Living people
Indian cricketers
Jharkhand cricketers
Place of birth missing (living people)